The 2013 FIBA Europe Under-20 Championship was the 16th edition of the FIBA Europe Under-20 Championship. The competition was played in Tallinn, Estonia, from 9 to 21 July 2013. For the first time competition was increased to 20 participating teams from tournament scheme of 16 teams which was introduced in 2005.

Participating teams
  (4th place, 2012 FIBA Europe Under-20 Championship Division B)
  (Winners, 2012 FIBA Europe Under-20 Championship Division B)
  (Runners-up, 2012 FIBA Europe Under-20 Championship Division B)

  (3rd place, 2012 FIBA Europe Under-20 Championship Division B)

First round
The first-round groups draw took place on 8 December 2012 in Freising, Germany. In this round, the twenty teams were allocated in four groups of five teams each. The top three advanced to the Second Round. The last two teams of each group played in the Classification Games.

Group A

Group B

Group C

Group D

Second round

Group E

|}

Group F

|}

Classification groups for 13th – 20th places

Group G

|}

Group H

|}

Classification playoffs for 9th – 20th place

Classification games for 17th – 20th place

Match for 19th place

Match for 17th place

Classification games for 13th – 16th place

Match for 15th place

Match for 13th place

Classification games for 9th – 12th place

Match for 11th place

Match for 9th place

Championship playoffs

Quarterfinals

Classification games for 5th – 8th place

Match for 7th place

Match for 5th place

Semifinals

Bronze medal game

Final

Final standings

Awards
Most Valuable Player
 Amedeo Della Valle

All-Tournament Team
 Kaspars Vecvagars
 Amedeo Della Valle
 Awudu Abass
 Daniel Díez
 Jānis Bērziņš

References

External links
FIBA Europe

FIBA U20 European Championship
2013–14 in European basketball
2013–14 in Estonian basketball
International youth basketball competitions hosted by Estonia
Sports competitions in Tallinn
21st century in Tallinn
July 2013 sports events in Europe